Alex Rodrigo da Silva Merlim (born 15 July 1986), also known as Babalu, is a Brazilian born Italian futsal player who plays for Sporting CP and the Italian national futsal team as a winger.

Honours
UEFA Futsal Champions League: 2018–19

References

External links

Sporting CP profile

1986 births
Living people
Sportspeople from Mato Grosso do Sul
Futsal forwards
Italian men's futsal players
Brazilian men's futsal players
Brazilian expatriates in Italy
Brazilian emigrants to Italy
Luparense Calcio a 5 players
Sporting CP futsal players
Brazilian people of Italian descent
Italian expatriate sportspeople in Portugal